Inertial Fusion Energy is a proposed approach to building a nuclear fusion power plant based on performing inertial confinement fusion at industrial scale.  This approach to fusion power is still in a research phase.  ICF first developed shortly after the development of the laser in 1960, but was a classified US research program during its earliest years.  In 1972, John Nuckolls wrote a paper predicting that compressing a target could create conditions where fusion reactions are chained together, a process known as fusion ignition or a burning plasma.  On August 8, 2021, the NIF at Livermore National Laboratory became the first ICF facility in the world to demonstrate this (see plot).  This breakthrough drove the US Department of Energy to create an Inertial Fusion Energy program in 2022 with a budget of 3 million dollars in its first year.

Design of a IFE power plant 
This kind of fusion reactor would consist of two parts: 
 Targets which can be small capsules (<7 millimeter diameter) that contain fusion fuel.  Although many kinds of targets have been tested including: cylinders, shells coated with nanotubes, solid blocks, hohlraum, glass shells filled with fusion fuel, cryogenically frozen targets, plastic shells, foam shells and materials suspended on spider silk. 
 Drivers which are used to compress and create a shock wave that squeezes the target.  This compression wave pushes the material down to the temperature and pressure where fusion occurs.  Drivers that have been explored are solid-state lasers, excimer lasers, high velocity solid objects, X-rays, beams of ions (heavy ion fusion (HIF)) and beams of electrons.

Net energy in ICF comes from getting fusion reactions to chain together in a process known as ignition.  To get there we need to squeeze material to hot and dense conditions for long enough.  But a key problem is that after a plasma becomes hot - it becomes hard to compress. The goal then is to avoid getting material hot until after it is compressed.  In literature, this is known as the low adiabatic approach to compression.  These steps are outlined below:
Keeping the plasma very cold, squeeze it together.
Heat the plasma only after it is squeezed; ideally inside a “hot spot”.
Fusion happens, and the resulting products deposit their energy creating more fusion.
Several compression approaches attempt to do this including: Central Hot Spot Ignition, Fast Ignition, Shock Ignition and Magneto-inertial-fusion.

ICF Research Institutions 

This program was originally established as a way to develop Nuclear weapons, because ICF mimics the compression physics of a fission-fusion bomb. These facilities have been built around the world, below are some examples. 
 Laser Mégajoule in France was developed in 2002 and upgraded in 2014.
 Omega Laser was first built in 1992 at the University of Rochester.
 Omega-EP was first built in 2008 at the University of Rochester as second more powerful laser beam.
 Gecko Laser was first built at Osaka University in Japan in 1983 but has since been upgraded nearly a dozen times. 
 NIF was first operational in 2009 at the Livermore National Laboratory. 
 NIKE Laser was built at the Naval Research Laboratory to study excimer (gas-based) lasers. 
 Electra Laser was built at the Naval Research Laboratory to study excimer (gas-based) lasers.
 PALS laser facility in the Czech Republic was established to research ICF laser implosions.  
 Machine 3 was developed by First Light Fusion to accelerate blocks of material to create a shockwave on the target.

There have also been multiple ICF facilities built, tested and decommissioned in the past.  For example, Sandia National Laboratory pursued a series (<10 machines) of ion-beam and electron-beam driven ICF research program through the 1970s and into the middle 1980s.  Alternatively, Los Alamos built a large, excimer laser facility called Aurora in the late 1980s. Livermore National Laboratory built a succession of laser facilities including Nova, Cyclops, 4-PI, SHIVA and other devices.  As part of the run up to the NIF opening and achieving ignition, Livermore National Laboratory funded a body of research around the Laser Inertial Fusion Energy program.  Under this program, a reactor design was developed, costing, reactor chambers and energy capture programs were explored.

IFE Research Programs 

IFE development has come in waves within the United States.  Below are some government programs that have been funded over the years to push this technology forward: 
 HAPL The high average laser program was administered by the Naval Research Laboratory from 1999 to 2008.  This program doled out grants to target, laser and driver teams across the United States and organized 19 meetings between member organizations.
 LIFE  The Laser Inertial Fusion Energy program was administered by Livermore National Laboratory from 2008 to 2016.  This program was funded to develop an IFE fusion power plant based around the National Ignition Facility. 
 SDI The Strategic Defense Initiative (SDI) inadvertently supported many of the IFE laser technologies seen today.

Driver Development 
It is still unclear which driver would work best for an IFE power plant, with supporters of different driver pushing their favorite approach. Lasers have thus far proven to be the most well researched.  Below is a summary of the laser drivers that have been studied.  The challenge with implementing laser systems does not just come from the beam, but also the optics, mirrors, amplifiers and gratings that are also needed to put this system in place.

Related Driver Technologies 
Depending on the driver that is being used there are key related technologies that need to be matured; below are some of these: 
 Glass that can handle the laser energy (Joules) crossing through the glass cross section (meters^2) and not melt or get damaged.  The glass is then used to make mirrors, lenses, gratings or windows inside the power plant. 
 Amplifiers that can be used to increase the power of the laser beam. 
 Compressors that can compress the laser beam or ion beam in space and time to increase the overall on-target power. 
 Pulsed Power systems that can deliver the megajoules needed to either a laser, ion-beam or solid object driver.  The workhorse of pulsed power (the Marx Generator) has limitations for an ICF plant and research has gone into Linear transformer driver as an alternative power source.
 Laser Diodes are used as the first step in transferring electrical energy into light energy to initiate the laser beam.  Such systems can be expensive and are not needed for excimer lasers. 
  Phase-Plate Smoothing is a technique to smooth out laser beams in solid-state laser systems.

Target Development 
There are many kinds of targets that have been developed for ICF research - but a power plant would require thousands if not millions of identical targets to be fired repeatedly.  This will be exceedingly challenging.  At present, the Department of Energy contracts with General Atomics to produce ICF targets for the national laboratories.  These targets are partially built at GA and then shipped across the country to the ICF facility for a shot day.  The Laboratories maintain hardware and staff onsite to complete the last steps to prepare the targets for a shot.

Target Example 
 Glass Shell targets were spheres of glass on stalks and filled with DT gas; these were some of the earliest targets. 
 Overcoated targets involve growing chemical materials over a shell target.  This can be done using directed Chemical Vapor Deposition of plastics or layers of gold or silvers.
 Hohlraum targets are pellets of DT fusion fuel that are surrounded by tubes of gold foil.  The laser strikes the foil and creates x-rays that compresses the targets; simulates nuclear weapons. 
 Silk Mounted Targets have been mounted on strands of spider silk; this material is the strongest material per cross-section known and maintains good characteristics down to cryogenic temperatures. 
 Cryogenic targets are those that must be kept below ~34 Kelvin to condense the hydrogen gas into liquid or ~14 kelvin to condense to a solid. 
 Foam Wetted targets are made using a variety of carbon-hydrogen foams and filled with liquid DT material cooled to below ~34 Kelvin. 
 Ice targets are made using a variety of carbon-hydrogen foams and filled with liquid DT material cooled to below ~14 Kelvin.

Cryogenic Targets 

There are several ways to get tritium and deuterium into an already-made capsule.  High pressure fills work by putting the shells in a chamber with 1 to 100 Atm of gas pressure and having the gas diffuse into the shell.  Cryogenic foam shells work can work by wicking in the liquid DT fluid into the foam.  This involves getting the delicate shell down in temperature and pressure without damaging it.  This is a stepwise process that can take hours to days in time and requires multiple containment chambers and various kinds of pumps.  At cryogenic temperatures, the DT gas forms into a fluid which can be wicked into the foam shell.  Once filled, operators slowly lower the temperature further to form the ice crystal.  Ice can start formation around the equator of the target and then grow into a complete crystal.  The ice is embedded with the foam shell structure.  Engineers have had problems with ice cracking during this formation process – all of which impacts the performance of the shot.  Monitoring of all of this is done using shadow grams, 360 X-ray diagnostics, visual inspection, and other tools; information is all run through software that gets a complete picture of the target during filling.

Moving Cryogenic Targets 
Keeping an ICF frozen at cryogenic temperatures while delivering it to the chamber for a shot is challenging.  For example, at the Laboratory for Laser Energetics the frozen target is held inside a custom-built, mobile cryogenic cart that can be moved into position under the target chamber.  The cart has a coolant system and vacuum pump to keep the material cold.  This cart holds the frozen target at the of a "cold finger" which is then raised on an elevator and positioned at the center of the chamber.  When the metal shroud is removed, the cryogenic target is exposed to room temperatures and starts to  sublimate immediately into gas.  This means that laser pulses must coordinate directly with the exposure of the target and everything has to happen quickly to keep the target from melting.

See also 

 Nuclear fusion
 Fusion power
 Inertial electrostatic confinement
 Inertial confinement fusion
 Laser inertial confinement
 Megajoule laser
 National Ignition Facility
 Z-pinch inertial confinement
 Z Pulsed Power Facility
 Project PACER
 List of plasma physics articles

Notes and references

Further reading
   (Université Bordeaux I, November 2005) 
 Tutorial on Heavy-Ion Fusion Energy(Virtual National Laboratory for Heavy-Ion Fusion)
   (November 2003)
   (Fusion Energy Sciences Advisory Committee, March 2004)
   (June 2005)
 Views on neutronics and activation issues facing liquid-protected IFE chambers
 IEEE-USA Position :  Fusion Energy Research & Development(June 2006)

Inertial confinement fusion
Energy development
Nuclear technology
Nuclear power stations
Osaka University research